Silver Maar (born 11 February 1999) is an Estonian volleyball player. He is a member of the Estonian national team since 2018 and represented his country at the 2019 European Volleyball Championships.

He started his professional career in club Pärnu VK.

References

Living people
1990 births
Estonian men's volleyball players
Estonian expatriate volleyball players
Estonian expatriate sportspeople in the Czech Republic
Expatriate volleyball players in the Czech Republic